She'll Be Wearing Pink Pyjamas is a 1985 British comedy film directed by John Goldschmidt and starring Julie Walters, Anthony Higgins and former Emmerdale actress Alyson Spiro. It deals with the experiences of eight women from diverse backgrounds on an all-female survival course in the Lake District. It was released on DVD in the UK in 2007.

Cast
Julie Walters - Fran 
Anthony Higgins - Tom 
Jane Evers - Catherine 
Janet Henfrey - Lucy 
Paula Jacobs - Doreen 
Penelope Nice - Ann 
Maureen O'Brien - Joan 
Alyson Spiro - Anita 
Jane Wood - Judith 
Pauline Yates - Diane

References

External links

1985 films
Film4 Productions films
British comedy films
Films scored by John Du Prez
1985 comedy films
1980s English-language films
1980s British films